Rugby in Canada may refer to:

 Rugby league in Canada
 Rugby union in Canada